Woodville is an unincorporated community in Clermont County, in the U.S. state of Ohio.

History
Woodville was laid out in 1828 by Jesse Wood, and named for him. A variant name was West Woodville. A post office called West Woodville was established in 1837, and remained in operation until 1906.

References

Unincorporated communities in Clermont County, Ohio
Unincorporated communities in Ohio